Aoraia orientalis is a species of moth of the family Hepialidae. It is endemic to New Zealand and is found in eastern Central Otago. It was described by John S. Dugdale in 1994.

The wingspan is 45–55 mm for males and 48–56 mm for females. The forewings are ash-white on a smoky brown ground colour. The hindwings are smoky grey. Adults are on wing in March and April.

References

External links

Citizen science observations

Moths described in 1994
Hepialidae
Moths of New Zealand
Endemic fauna of New Zealand
Endemic moths of New Zealand